John Boscawen Burland  (born 4 March 1936) is an Emeritus Professor and Senior Research Investigator at the Department of Civil and Environmental Engineering of Imperial College London.

In 2016, Burland was elected as a member into the National Academy of Engineering for contributions to geotechnical engineering and the design, construction, and preservation of civil infrastructure and heritage buildings.

Early education
John Burland attended Parktown Boys' High School and then received a First Class Honours BSc degree in Civil Engineering from Witwatersrand University in 1959. Then he moved to the University of Cambridge where he carried out research in Soil Mechanics under the supervision of Professor Kenneth H. Roscoe which led to the award of a PhD degree in 1967. His thesis title was Deformation of soft clay. He then moved to Imperial College London where he served as Professor of Soil Mechanics for over 20 years and Head of the Geotechnics Section.

Achievements
Burland is best known as the engineer who prevented the Leaning Tower of Pisa from toppling over,  He was awarded the Knight Commander of the Royal Order of Francis I by the Duke of Castro. He was also involved in ensuring that the Houses of Parliament and Big Ben were unharmed by the extension of the London Underground Jubilee line.

Burland worked also on the construction of a large underground car park at the Palace of Westminster and the stabilising of the Metropolitan Cathedral of Mexico City. His team was also involved in the extension of the Jubilee line and he has advised on many geotechnical aspects of that project, including ensuring the stability of the Big Ben Clock Tower.

He is very well known for his work on critical state soil mechanics and the development of the Modified Cam Clay constitutive model for reconstituted clays.

Awards
His contribution to soil mechanics has been greatly acknowledged and he was invited to deliver the 30th Rankine Lecture of the British Geotechnical Association titled "On the compressibility and shear strength of natural clays". Moreover, he was awarded the Institution of Structural Engineers Gold Medal in 1997. In 2002 he presented the Higginson Lecture and the Victor de Mello Lecture. He was appointed as a Fellow of the Royal Academy of Engineering, and appointed CBE in the 2005 New Year Honours. In 2016 he was elected an international member of the National Academy of Engineering.

Burland also received an honorary doctorate from Heriot-Watt University in 1994

See also
 Imperial College Civil & Environmental Engineering

References

External links
 Professor John Burland

1936 births
Academics of Imperial College London
Alumni of Parktown Boys' High School
Commanders of the Order of the British Empire
Engineering educators
Fellows of the Royal Academy of Engineering
Fellows of the Royal Society
Geotechnical engineers
Living people
Rankine Lecturers